On Prospect Park is a condominium at 1 Grand Army Plaza in Brooklyn, New York City, designed by the noted architect Richard Meier. The building is an all-glass, modernist, luxury high-rise overlooking Prospect Park and Grand Army Plaza. The AIA Guide described the design as "a massive beached whale".

References

Condominiums and housing cooperatives in Brooklyn
Skyscrapers in Brooklyn
Richard Meier buildings
Residential skyscrapers in New York City
Grand Army Plaza
Buildings and structures completed in 2008